The 2014 Euro Beach Soccer Cup was the fourteenth edition of the Euro Beach Soccer Cup, one of Europe's main, regular international beach soccer championships organised every two years by Beach Soccer Worldwide (BSWW), held in August 2014, in Baku, Azerbaijan.

Just six nations took part as in 2008, compared to the usual eight, and the teams were not the top-ranked nations from the preceding Euro Beach Soccer League season as in the past but a mix of teams from the divisions as listed below. The competition started with a round-robin ground stage for only the third time, instead of a straight knock-out tournament, with the top two nations from the groups competing in a final match for the title, the others in the respective positions in their groups playing for third and fifth place in classifying matches to determine the final standings.

Spain won the championship for the fourth time, their third win in their last five appearances and their fourth title overall.

Participating teams
The teams were announced on August 7.

 Bold indicates champion for that year. Italic indicates host for that year.
* = hosts of this year
1Note: 1998-2010 annual basis (excluding 2000), biennial basis post-2010.

Group stage

Group A

Group B

Classification matches

Fifth place play-off

Third place play-off

Final

Winners

Awards

Goalscorers

11 goals
 Noel Ott
7 goals
 Llorenç Gomez
5 goals
 Dejan Stankovic
 Gábor Simonyi
4 goals
 Theofilos Triantafyllidis
 Asif Zeynalov
 Sabir Allahguliyev
3 goals
 Antonio Mayor Hernández
 Juanma

 Aleksei Krutikov
 Yury Krasheninnikov
2 goals
 Mo Jaeggy
 Sandro Spaccarotella
 Zeynal Zeynalov
 Renat Sultanov
 Daniel Pajón Gómez
 Viktor Fekete
 Aleksey Makarov
 Artur Paporotnyi
 Péter Ábel
 Salavador Ardil 'Chyki'
 Kirill Romanov
 Yury Kotov

1 goal
 Phillipp Borer
 Christos Salapatas
 Athanasios Kakaroumpas
 Amid Nazarov
 Miguel Santiso Mosquera 'Kuman'
 Norbert Sebestyen
 Jomard Bakshaliyev
 Spyridon-Evangelos Gkritzalis-Papadopoulos
 Stavros Amanatidis
 Konstantinos Papastathopoulos

Final standings

References

Euro Beach Soccer Cup
2014 in beach soccer
2014 in Azerbaijani sport
International association football competitions hosted by Azerbaijan